Gleise is a river in Thuringia, Germany. It flows into the Saale near Golmsdorf.

See also
List of rivers of Thuringia

Rivers of Thuringia
Rivers of Germany